Andrea Garnett may refer to:

Andrea Garnett, fictional character in The Last Ship (TV series)
Andrea Garnett, actress in The Other Me